Shariatmadari may refer to:
Mohammad Kazem Shariatmadari (1905–1986), Iranian Grand Ayatollah
Ali Shariatmadari (1924–2017), Iranian academic and educationist, Minister of Culture in the interim government of Mehdi Bazargan in 1979
Hassan Shariatmadari, Iranian opposition politician and son of Mohammad Kazem Shariatmadari
Hossein Shariatmadari (born 1948), Iranian journalist
Mohammad Shariatmadari (born 1960), Iranian politician, and Vice President for External Affairs from 2013–2017